David Haynes is an American novelist. He has written over a dozen books for adults and children. He teaches at Southern Methodist University in Dallas. In 1996, he was chosen as one of the best young American novelists by Granta magazine.

Bibliography

Right By My Side (1993) (New Rivers Press)
Somebody Else's Mama (1995) (Milkweed Editions)
All American Dream Dolls (Milkweed Editions), 
Welcome to Your World: Writings for the Heart of Young America (with Julie Landsman) (Milkweed Editions)
The Everyday Magic of Walterlee Higgins (Minnesota Center for Book Arts 1998 Winter Book Project), 
The Full Matilda (2004)
 A Star in the Face of the Sky (2013)

References

External links 
• David Haynes talks about Right By My Side and Somebody Else's Mama with Arts-Us Director Toni Carter, Northern Lights Minnesota Author Interview TV Series #338 (1995):  [https://reflections.mndigital.org/catalog/p16022coll38:59#/kaltura_video] 

• David Haynes talks about All American Dream Dolls and his project with Julie Landsman, along with his MCBA book with Mary Jo Pauly, Northern Lights TV Series #418 (1999):  [https://reflections.mndigital.org/catalog/p16022coll38:102#/kaltura_video] 

American male novelists
Living people
African-American novelists
20th-century American novelists
Southern Methodist University faculty
Year of birth missing (living people)
Place of birth missing (living people)
20th-century American male writers
20th-century African-American writers
21st-century African-American people
African-American male writers